Zagajów may refer to the following places:
Zagajów, Busko County in Świętokrzyskie Voivodeship (south-central Poland)
Zagajów, Kazimierza County in Świętokrzyskie Voivodeship (south-central Poland)
Zagajów, Pińczów County in Świętokrzyskie Voivodeship (south-central Poland)